The initials KBH are used for:

Copenhagen (København), Kbh. or Kbhvn, sometimes used in English text
 kbh. is used for københavnsk (of Copenhagen)
Camsá language, ISO 639-3 code
Kantha Bopha Hospital, affiliated to the Ministry of Health (Cambodia)
KB Home, NYSE symbol